The Little Things is an indie-rom-com with a supernatural twist. Supported by an alternative soundtrack it tells the story of a girl named Dee (AFI Nominated Actress Kathryn Beck), who believes she has a gift that can alter people destinies, provided she never leaves her house.  However, when her powers are threatened by the possibility of eviction her only hope is the first love and life she effected with her gift, Mitch. (Chris Hillier) But he may not be so willing to help when he finds out his entire life has been manipulated all along.

Cast
 Chris Hillier as Mitch
 Kathryn Beck as Dee
 Cleo Massey as Young Dee
 Tim Boyle as Tom
 Marea Lambert-Barker Suzie
 Todd Levi as Angus
 Luke Howell as Young Mitch

Accolades and screenings
 Maryland International Film Festival AWARD BEST FEATURE FILM
 The Indie AWARD Best Film 
 The Indie AWARD Best Actress Kathryn Beck
 The Indie AWARD Best Director
 American International Film Festival AWARD Best Dramatic Feature
 American International Film Festival AWARD Best Actor
 American International Film Festival AWARD Best Actress
 American International Film Festival AWARD Most Promising New Actor
 American International Film Festival AWARD Most Promising New Actress
 Maryland International Film Festival OFFICIAL SELECTION
 Lucerne International Film Festival OFFICIAL SELECTION
Melbourne Underground Film Festival OFFICIAL SELECTION
 Columbia Gorge International Film Festival OFFICIAL SELECTION
 American International Film Festival OFFICIAL SELECTION
 Gold Coast International Film Festival OFFICIAL SELECTION

References

External links

2010 films
Australian independent films
2010s English-language films
2010s Australian films